Confluaria is a genus of flatworms belonging to the family Hymenolepididae. It contains six species, with the seventh species added in 2008.

Confluaria capillaris 
Confluaria furcifera 
Confluaria islandica 
Confluaria japonica 
Confluaria krabbei 
Confluaria podicipina 
Confluaria pseudofurcifera

References

Cestoda